Edward Juniper (born 3 December 1901, date of death unknown) was a footballer who played in The Football League for Clapton Orient. He was born in Shadwell, England.

References

English footballers
Leyton Orient F.C. players
English Football League players
1901 births
Year of death missing
Association football forwards
People from Shadwell